Woodburn is an unincorporated community in Loudoun County, Virginia. The village is located on Hogback Mountain southwest of Leesburg. Woodburn Road, which runs between Dry Mill and Harmony Church Roads, is all that is left to mark the existence and location of the community. The ruins of Woodburn's general store stood just north of the road's intersection with Forrestgrove Road until about 2000 when the Virginia Department of Transportation (VDOT), overturned the Loudoun County Board of Supervisors' decision to leave the road unpaved and paved and widened the road, demolishing the general store in the process.

Unincorporated communities in Loudoun County, Virginia
Washington metropolitan area
Unincorporated communities in Virginia